In season 2010-11 Red Star Belgrade will be competing in Serbian SuperLiga, Serbian Cup and UEFA Europa League.

Previous season positions
The club competed in Serbian SuperLiga, Serbian Cup in domestic and UEFA Europa League in European competitions. Finishing 2nd in domestic league, behind FK Partizan, winning domestic cup by defeating FK Vojvodina in final match, and losing to Czech champion Slavia Prague in play off for UEFA Europa League.

For winning in the domestic cup team qualified for this year's UEFA Europa League.

Players

Squad statistics

1 These players also hold Serbian citizenship.

Player transfer

In

Out

Competitions

Serbian SuperLiga

Red Star Belgrade competed with 15 other teams in the 5th season of Serbian SuperLiga. They finished second, for a second time in a row, behind Partizan

Results

Kickoff times are in CET.

Serbian Cup

Red Star Belgrade participated in the 5th Serbian Cup starting in the Round of 32. They were eliminated in Semi final by Partizan.

Round of 32

Round of 16

Quarter final

Semi final

UEFA Europa League

By winning in the 2009-10 Serbian Cup, Red Star Belgrade qualified for the Europa League. They started in the third qualifying round and were immediately by Slovak side Slovan Bratislava.

Third qualifying round

References

External links
 Official Website
 UEFA

2010-11
Serbian football clubs 2010–11 season